Tropidia albistylum (Macquart, 1847), the Yellow-thighed Thickleg Fly, is a rare species of syrphid fly observed across the eastern and central United States. Hoverflies can remain nearly motionless in flight. The adults are also known as flower flies for they are commonly found on flowers, from which they get both energy-giving nectar and protein-rich pollen. The larvae are aquatic.

Distribution
It is found in the eastern United States, (Michigan to New Jersey, south to Texas & Florida).

References

Eristalinae
Diptera of North America
Hoverflies of North America
Insects of the United States
Endemic fauna of the United States
Taxa named by Pierre-Justin-Marie Macquart
Insects described in 1847